Heoninneung is a burial ground from the Joseon dynasty, located in Seocho District, Seoul. This is where King Taejong and King Sunjo are entombed, along with their wives, Queen Wongyeong and Queen Sunwon.

Characteristics
Heonneung is made up of twin mounds connected by railings, with the king entombed in the left one, while the queen is in the right one.

Inneung consists of one mound only, that houses both the king and the queen. King Sunjo was originally buried in Jangneung in Paju, but his tomb was moved to the current location in 1856 due to auspicious reasons of geomancy.

References

Royal Tombs of the Joseon Dynasty
Seocho District